The Digswell Viaduct, also called Welwyn Viaduct,  is a railway viaduct that carries the East Coast Main Line over the River Mimram in the county of Hertfordshire in England. A prominent local landmark, it is located between Welwyn Garden City and Digswell. It is just to the south of Welwyn North railway station.

The viaduct, of 40 arches, is a Grade II* listed structure. It was the longest and tallest viaduct on the Great Northern Railway's route.

It is built of red brick fired from clay quarried on site during construction, and took two years to build, including the construction of embankments at both ends which required the movement of around one million tons of earth by human and horse power. It was designed by William Cubitt and styled after a Roman aqueduct.

It has been claimed that it was officially opened by Queen Victoria on 6 August 1850, but she was reportedly so frightened of its height that she refused to travel across it and left the train, using a horse-drawn carriage to travel the length of the bridge on the ground.  However, her published diaries for that day show that she was staying at Osborne House on the Isle of Wight at the time.

The viaduct carries the East Coast Main Line, which has to narrow from four tracks to two to cross the viaduct, making it a bottleneck restraining capacity over this strategic transport route. This problem is exacerbated by Welwyn North railway station situated at the northern end of the viaduct, which blocks the line while trains are stationary, and by two tunnels to the north. Several ideas to overcome the limitations of the viaduct and station without damaging the viaduct's essential historic character and rhythmic design are periodically discussed.

A three-year project in the mid 1930s encased the viaduct's deteriorating brickwork in the blue engineering brick seen today. Overhead lines were added when the line was electrified in the 1970s.

References

External links

Short History

Railway viaducts in Hertfordshire
Buildings and structures in Welwyn Hatfield (district)
Grade II* listed buildings in Hertfordshire
East Coast Main Line
Grade II* listed bridges in England